Callaways Little Island, or Kirkland Island, is a small island 1.4 miles WSW of Tallassee, Tennessee within the Chilhowee Shoals of the Little Tennessee River, Monroe County, Tennessee.

References

Landforms of Monroe County, Tennessee
River islands of Tennessee